The 2012 Cincinnati Bengals season was the team's 45th season as a professional sports franchise and its 43rd season as a member of the National Football League (NFL). This also marked the 22nd season under the leadership of owner and team president Mike Brown and the 10th season under head coach Marvin Lewis. The team improved on its 2011 season, finishing tied with the Baltimore Ravens for the AFC North division title, but lost the tiebreaker to the Ravens. The Bengals, however, made the playoffs as a wild card team, finishing as the 6th seed in the AFC playoffs, but lost to the Houston Texans for a second consecutive season.

2012 was the first non-strike season in Bengals history in which they made it to the NFL playoffs for a second consecutive year.

Draft

Notes
 The team acquired this first-round selection and a conditional 2013 second-round selection in trade that sent quarterback Carson Palmer to the Oakland Raiders.
 From Saints through the Patriots.
 The team acquired this fifth-round selection and a 2013 sixth-round selection in a trade that sent wide receiver Chad Ochocinco to the New England Patriots.
 The team acquired this fifth-round selection in a trade that sent linebacker Keith Rivers to the New York Giants.
The team also traded its seventh-round selection (#228 overall) and cornerback David Jones to the Jacksonville Jaguars in exchange for safety Reggie Nelson.

Staff

Final roster

Preseason

Regular season

Schedule

Note: Intra-division opponents are in bold text.

Game summaries

Week 1: at Baltimore Ravens

The Bengals started their season on Monday Night Football against the Ravens.  The first quarter was all Ravens as they put up a 10–0 lead when Justin Tucker kicked a 46-yard field goal followed up by Ray Rice running for a 7-yard TD.  The Bengals got on the board in the 2nd quarter when Mike Nugent kicked a 34-yard field goal shortening the lead to 10–3.  The Ravens pulled away when Anquan Boldin caught a 34-yard TD pass from Joe Flacco for a 17–3 game.  The Bengals wrapped up the first half scoring with BenJarvus Green-Ellis running for a 6-yard TD for a 17–10 game.  After the break, the Bengals came within 4 when Nugent nailed a 19-yard field goal for a 17–13 game.  However, from that moment out it was all Ravens as Dennis Pitta caught a 10-yard TD pass from Joe Flacco for a 24–13 game followed by Tucker's 40-yard field goal to put them ahead 27–13 and Ed Reed's 40-yard interception return for a TD for a 34–13 game.  In the last quarter, they wrapped the game up with Rice running for a 1-yard TD for a 41–13 game and Tucker's 39-yard field goal for a 44–13 final score.

With the loss, the Bengals started their season 0–1, losing their regular season opener for 4 out of the last 5 seasons dating back to 2008.

Week 2: vs. Cleveland Browns

After a tough loss on Monday Night Football, the Bengals returned home for Week 2 against the Browns.  The Bengals were able to get the first points on the board with Adam "Pacman" Jones returning a punt 81 yards for a touchdown for a 7–0 lead.  The Browns then shortened their lead to 4 points with Phil Dawson's 50-yard field goal to make the score 7–3.  The Bengals then moved ahead by 11 points as Andy Dalton found A. J. Green on a 10-yard touchdown pass for a 14–3 lead, however the Browns again came within 4 as Trent Richardson ran for a touchdown from 32 yards out.  The Bengals then moved ahead 17–10 with Mike Nugent's 39-yard field goal before halftime.  Coming back, the Bengals increased their lead with Dalton finding Brandon Tate on a 44-yard pass for a 24–10 lead.  However, The Browns drew closer as Brandon Weeden found Richardson on a 23-yard pass to shorten the game to 24–17.  Then the Bengals moved up in the 4th quarter as Dalton found Andrew Hawkins on a 50-yard touchdown pass for a 31–17 lead but the Browns came within a touchdown after Weeden found Greg Little on a 24-yard pass to make the score 31–24.  Mike Nugent then nailed a 37-yard field goal to give the Bengals a 34–24 lead then the Browns wrapped things up as Phil Dawson scored a 25-yard field goal for a final score of 34–27.

With the win, the Bengals improved to 1–1.

Week 3: at Washington Redskins

Sitting at 1–1, the Bengals traveled to Washington to face the Redskins, with rookie quarterback Robert Griffin III making his home debut. On the first play from scrimmage, Bengals' wide receiver and former college quarterback Mohamed Sanu launched a 73-yard touchdown to AJ Green to give Cincinnati an early touchdown advantage. Bengals third-year quarterback Andy Dalton started his day with a 0-yard interception touchdown by Rob Jackson that tied the game at seven, but soon went on an impressive tear the rest of the game. Dalton rebounded with a 48-yard touchdown to Armon Binns, part of 17 unanswered points by the Bengals that gave them a 24–7 lead late in the first half. Billy Cundiff added a late field goal that made the score 24–10, Cincinnati, at half time. The Redskins made a run at the Bengals in the third quarter, scoring back-to-back touchdowns on a  touchdown run by Alfred Morris and a two-yard pass from Griffin to Santana Moss, which tied the game at 24. However, on the first two fourth-quarter drives for Cincinnati, Dalton gave his team the lead back—firing two touchdowns, one to Jermaine Gresham from six yards away, the other to Andrew Hawkins who dashed and weaved his way for a 59-yard score that put Cincinnati once again up 14, 38–24. Robert Griffin III scrambled and dived his way into the end zone with three-and-a-half minutes remaining, but the Redskins' comeback effort fell short as Griffin's hail Mary pass was knocked away on the final play.

With the win, the Bengals improved to 2–1.

Week 4: at Jacksonville Jaguars

With the win, the Bengals improved to 3–1 capturing their 3rd 3–1 start under Marvin.

Week 5: vs. Miami Dolphins

With the loss, the Bengals dropped to 3–2.  With the Ravens' win over the Chiefs, the Bengals now sit in 2nd place in the AFC North.

Week 6: at Cleveland Browns

With the surprising loss, the Bengals dropped to 3–3 and their 4-game winning streak against the Browns was snapped.

Week 7: vs. Pittsburgh Steelers

The Bengals went home for a divisional game against their longtime rival Steelers.  The Steelers came into this stadium 0–3 in road games.  Despite the Bengals' 11-point lead in the first half, it was ereased in the 2nd half as the Steelers won the game 24–17.  The loss dropped the Bengals to 3–4 and 3rd place in the AFC North.

Week 9: vs. Denver Broncos

The Bengals returned home following their bye week for a week 9 matchup with the Denver Broncos. They entered the game having lost three straight games following their 3–1 start to the season. Entering the game, Broncos quarterback Peyton Manning had never lost to Cincinnati in his career.
The two teams traded field goals early, with Broncos kicker Matt Prater connecting on a 43-yard field goal and the Bengals Mike Nugent successfully booting a 28-yard attempt. On the Broncos possession following the Bengals field goal, Peyton Manning masterfully moved the Broncos down the field, dissecting the Cincinnati secondary quickly, leading to an eight play,  eighty yard drive, highlighted by a forty-five yard strike to receiver Demarious Thomas, and culminated with a thirteen-yard pass to Eric Decker for the score. Following the Broncos touchdown, Denver led 10–3.
The Broncos increased their lead to a score of 17–3 on the opening kickoff of the second half, as receiver Trindon Holliday returned the football 105 yards for the score, dealing a sharp blow to a Bengals team that had previously been sticking close to the Broncos.
The score appeared to motivate the Bengals, as they scored the next seventeen points. Second year receiver AJ Green captured a touchdown reception for the seventh straight game, after quarterback Andy Dalton found him on a 10-yard strike.
Each of the next two Denver possessions were ended by Cincinnati cornerback Terrance Newman intercepting Denver quarterback Peyton Manning. A forty-nine yard Mike Nugent field goal, and a two-yard BenJarvus Green-Ellis touchdown run were the result of the two ensuing Bengal possessions; giving them a 20–17 advantage.
Peyton Manning then engineered back-to-back touchdown drives, separated by Andy Dalton throwing an interception of his own. Because the drives took place in the fourth quarter, Manning was officially credited with his forty-eighth career game-winning drive, surpassing Dan Marino for the NFL record.
The Bengals attempted a late comeback, scoring three points on a Mike Nugent field goal, but were unable to recover an onside kick attempt to give themselves a chance to tie the game.

With the loss, the Bengals dropped to 3–5.

Week 10: vs. New York Giants

The Cincinnati Bengals entered their week ten matchup with the New York Giants reeling after four consecutive losses, separated by their week 8 bye week. Following their 3–1 start to the season, the Bengals had lost all momentum and fallen heavily in the AFC standings.
Despite being heavy underdogs, the Bengals came out and grabbed the momentum of the football game early, scoring on their first possession of the game. Playing against a defense that Cincinnati receiver AJ Green remarked “[had] a lot of holes," earlier in the week, Green culminated Cincinnati's first possession with a fifty-six yard touchdown reception, beating a badly blown coverage on the play. The score marked Green's eighth straight contest with a touchdown reception, which tied him with former Bengal TJ Houshmandzadeh for second all-time in Bengals history.
The ensuing Giants possession was three-and-out. New York Giant punter Sean Weatherford then looked to have gotten a spectacular punt away, which would have forced Cincinnati to start their possession inside their own twenty yard-line. However, a penalty on Giants cornerback Justin Tryon for intentionally leaving the field of play rendered the punt moot, and forced the Giants to re-attempt the play. On the ensuing punt, Bengals cornerback Adam “Pacman” Jones returned the ball sixty-eight yards to the Giants eleven yard line. The Bengals did not hesitate to take advantage of the large swing in field positioning, as second year quarterback Andy Dalton connected with receiver Andrew Hawkins for an eleven-yard touchdown strike on third-and-ten. The three play drive took only eighteen seconds off of the clock, and gave the Bengals a 14–0 advantage.
The Giants saw a measure of momentum swing in their favor as following their ensuing possession, which resulted in a three-and-out from New York, Cincinnati receiver Brandon Tate fumbled Weatherford's punt, giving the Giants possession of the football inside Cincinnati territory for the first time in the afternoon. The Giants took advantage of the mistake, turning the fumble into a twenty-three yard field goal by placekicker Lawrence Tynes.
After both teams traded punts, the Bengals expanded their lead further, putting together a fifteen play drive that took over seven minutes off of the clock and resulted in a twenty-eight yard field goal by Mike Nugent. The score put Cincinnati up by 17–3 with time dwindling in the first half.
The ensuing Giants possession took all but eleven second of the 4:17 that remained in the opening half with Lawrence Tynes making a thirty-one yard field goal at its finish. The points got the Giants back to within eleven points at the half, with the score 17–6 in favour of Cincinnati.
The first five possessions coming out of the half, two of which ended in New York Giant turnovers, did not result in any points being scored by either team. However, following an Eli Manning interception, Cincinnati took advantage of the short field and pick up their third touchdown on the afternoon. The Bengals second three-play touchdown drive of the game was capped off by Andy Dalton hitting tight end Jermaine Gresham for a ten-yard receiving touchdown, making the score 24–6 in favour of Cincinnati.
New York's next possession resulted in another Manning interception. The result for Cincinnati was the same, with Dalton culminating yet another three-play touchdown drive by hitting first-year receiver Mohamed Sanu for a ten-yard strike. The touchdown was Sanu's first receiving touchdown in the National Football League, though he had already thrown for a touchdown in Cincinnati's week 3 encounter with the Washington Redskins. The touchdown, also representing a career-high fourth on the afternoon for Andy Dalton, gave the Bengals their final points of the afternoon, and a 31–6 advantage.
The rest of the game was largely uneventful, with both teams accepting the fate of the game as having already been determined. The Giants were able to put up their lone touchdown of the game following a thirteen play, ninety-eight yard possession that was capped by running back Ahmad Bradshaw punching the ball in from two yards away. The lone Giants touchdown of the afternoon was also the last score, making the final 31–13 Cincinnati.
With the victory, the Bengals snapped their previous four game losing streak and improved their record to 4–5 on the season. They also improved to 6–0 all time against the Giants at home.

Week 11: at Kansas City Chiefs

The Bengals entered their week eleven matchup with the Kansas City Chiefs sporting a 4–5 record coming off an upset victory over reigning the Super Bowl champions, the New York Giants.
The Chiefs began the scoring in the game, completing an eight play, fifty-nine-yard drive with a thirty-four-yard Ryan Succop field goal following three-and-outs by both teams one their respective first possessions of the football game. From there however, the momentum swung heavily in the favour of the Bengals, who reeled off the next twenty-one consecutive points.
The Bengals began their run by completing an eleven play, seventy-eight-yard drive with a four-yard touchdown pass from sophomore quarterback Andy Dalton, to fellow sophomore receiver AJ Green. The drive, highlighted by two different successful fourth down conversions by the Bengals offensive unit, was seen as a catalyst for the momentum swing that took place by Cincinnati running back BenJarvus Green-Ellis. The touchdown marked the ninth straight game with a receiving score for the second year receiver out of the University of Georgia. The streak, the current longest in the National Football League, also broke the Cincinnati Bengals single-season franchise record for consecutive games with a receiving touchdown.
After the teams traded two possessions each that resulted in points for neither team, Cincinnati manifested a five play, fifty-seven yard drive. The drive appeared to culminate on a ten-yard throw from Andy Dalton to third-year tight end Jermaine Gresham, out of the University of Oklahoma. However, upon booth review, Gresham was deemed to have been tackled just within the 1-yard line. Dalton ran the ball in one play later, on a bootleg run to make the score 14–3 in favour of Cincinnati.
Following another Kansas City punt, the Bengals continued their onslaught, as their offense engineered an eleven play, seventy-nine yard drive highlighted by runs of twenty-one and seventeen yards respectively by running backs BenJarvus Green-Ellis and Cedric Peerman. The drive was capped off by a one-yard touchdown scamper by Green-Ellis, putting the Bengals ahead by a commanding 21–3 score.
Just before the half time break, Kansas City showed signs of life, completing several medium-range passes during a quick seven play, sixty-five yard drive. Place kicker Ryan Succop was successful on his second attempt of the afternoon, nailing the thirty-three yard field goal, bringing the Chiefs to within a score of 21–6 at half time.
After each team was unsuccessful on their respective two possessions in the third quarter of play, Cincinnati scored the final points of the football game on the opening possession of the fourth quarter. Andy Dalton finished off the Bengals twelve play, seventy-two yard drive by hitting rookie receiver Mohamed Sanu. The touchdown gave the Bengals a 28–6 advantage which was the final score on the day.
With the victory, the Bengals evened their record at 5–5 on the season, pulling to within one game of both the Indianapolis Colts and the division rival Pittsburgh Steelers in the AFC Wildcard playoff race.

Week 12: vs. Oakland Raiders

In Carson Palmer's long-awaited return to the Queen City after departing following the 2010 season, the Bengals set the tone from the beginning of the contest, with Geno Atkins slamming a play-action Palmer to the turf on the game's first play from scrimmage. After a BenJarvus Green-Ellis one-yard touchdown run opened the scoring for Cincinnati, quarterback Andy Dalton tossed back-to-back red zone scores to wide receiver Mohamed Sanu to give Cincinnati a 21-point advantage. Kicker Mike Nugent added on to that lead with a 55-yard field goal as time expired in the second quarter to give the Bengals a 24–0 lead going into intermission. Oakland responded with a great third quarter, however; following Sebastian Janikowski's own 55-yarder that put Oakland on the board, Palmer lofted a 20-yard touchdown to Denarius Moore that made the score 24–10, Bengals. After a Kevin Huber punt gave Oakland the ball back and a chance to cut the lead into single digits, Palmer was sacked and stripped by Manny Lawson near midfield, and linebacker Rey Maualuga recovered. It was all Cincinnati after that as Nugent knocked his second field goal of the game to extend Cincinnati's lead to three possessions. Dalton added one more touchdown on the day, finding tight end Jermaine Gresham from seven yards away to make the score 34–10, which stood as the final.

Coming into the game, A. J. Green had a streak of nine consecutive games in which he scored a touchdown. That streak, however, was snapped in this game, although he did have 111 receiving yards on three catches.

Week 13: at San Diego Chargers

With the win, the Bengals went to 7–5.

Week 14: vs. Dallas Cowboys

Dan Bailey's clutch field goal to beat Cincinnati dropped the Bengals' record to 7–6. It was the second consecutive game in which A. J. Green did not record a touchdown reception; he had in eight straight before that. This would also be Cincinnati's last home loss until week 10 in 2014 against Cleveland.

Week 15: at Philadelphia Eagles

The Bengals improved to 8–6 by winning in Philadelphia on Thursday Night Football, thus securing their second consecutive non-losing season for the first time since 2003–2006. Cincinnati is now 2–0 at Lincoln Financial Field and hopes to secure a second straight playoff appearance by beating the Steelers (7–7) on the other side of Pennsylvania in Week 16.

Week 16: at Pittsburgh Steelers

With the victory over their hated rival in Western Pennsylvania, the Bengals increased their regular season record to 9–6 and finished 6–2 in road games, clinching a winning season and playoff spot for the third time in the last four seasons and also clinching consecutive winning seasons and playoff berths for the first time since 1981 and 1982 seasons. By improving to 5–7 at Heinz Field, Cincinnati defeated the Steelers for the first time since 2009 when they won the AFC North after going 6–0 against their three rivals. This was the first time since 1988 when the Bengals had a successful two-week road trip in Pennsylvania.

Due to the Ravens clinching the AFC North following a victory over the Giants a few hours later, the Bengals were assigned to one of the two wild card seeds along with the Indianapolis Colts (10–5). With the Colts' victory over the Chiefs that day, the Bengals were given the 6th seed since the Colts had a better record than them against common opponents (4–1 vs. 3–2).

Week 17: vs. Baltimore Ravens

After a tough road win over the Steelers, the Bengals returned home for a Week 17 duel against the Ravens.  Quarterback Andy Dalton left the game to rest up for the playoffs in the second half after completing 10 passes in 15 attempts for 78 yards and one touchdown.  The Bengals were able to snap their 4-game losing streak against the Ravens and finish their season 10–6.  And with the Patriots and Broncos' wins and the Texans' loss, the Bengals traveled to Houston to take on the #3 seeded Texans in the playoffs.

Standings

Postseason

Schedule

Game summaries

AFC Wild Card Playoffs: at (3) Houston Texans

The #6 seed Bengals traveled to Houston to take on the #3 seeded Texans in a defensive showdown.  However, the Bengals lost in the playoffs for the second straight year while at the same time losing their fifth straight playoff game dating to 1991, ending their season with an overall record of 10–7 and dropped to 0–4 under Marvin Lewis in the playoffs.

Statistics

Team leaders

Stats values are correct through Week 14.

League rankings
 Total Offense (YPG): 356.8 (15th)
 Passing (YPG): 242 (13th) 
 Rushing (YPG): 115.1 (T-13th)
 Total Defense (YPG): 331.3 (8th)
 Passing (YPG): 221 (11th)
 Rushing (YPG): 110.3 (11th)

Stats correct through week 14.

References

External links
 

Cincinnati
Cincinnati Bengals seasons
Cincin